Abuladze is a Georgian surname. Notable people with the surname include:

 Ilia Abuladze (1901–1968), Georgian philologist
 Tengiz Abuladze (1924–1994), Georgian film director

Georgian-language surnames
Surnames of Georgian origin